Pelton Fell is a village in County Durham, UK

History 
Adjacent to the park, on Station Lane, the Miner's Institute was built in 1889 and later expanded in 1909 to cope with a rise in population. The institute was used for many social activities and local clubs up until the 1990s when it fell derelict and was later destroyed by fire. There are now four newly built detached houses on the site.

A Durham County Council sponsored redevelopment of the village began in 2004 with a significant number of council houses, and a small number of private houses, demolished. This was done to make way for more modern accommodation, which is to a mix of social housing and private housing.

Location 
Pelton Fell is situated a short distance to the north-west of Chester-le-Street. It is the site of a former coal mine and a closed railway station primarily used to service both Pelton Fell and Pelton, a village at the opposite end of Station Lane, although very few traces of either remain today, except in some of the street names.

Features 
Primarily residential, it has a small village shop, a doctor's surgery and a newly open community centre called the Brockwell Centre. There is a Bar/Restaurant at the far end of the village, called The Moorings, with an attached hotel, which opened in April 2007. This is the area traditionally referred to as Hett Hills.

The Pelton Fell working men's club was closed and demolished in March 2008, several years after the Colliery Inn was closed and demolished only 100 yards from the same location. A small industrial estate called Stella Gill was established in the late 1980s and primarily provides start up premises for small businesses.

A substantial proportion of the village is made up of pre and post Second World War council housing, many of which (particularly in the north of the village) have been purchased under the right to buy scheme. The village is split into two sides by an area locally called 'The Battery'. On the Station Lane side is Pelton Fell memorial Park, housing a war memorial, tennis courts, children's play area, and a bowling green home to the local bowling club.

Pelton Fell Football Club play home games on the football pitches situated at the rear of Park View and Battle Green, just off Station Lane.

External links

Miners – History of Pelton Fell
History of Pelton Fell

Villages in County Durham